The Arboretum de Podestat (4 hectares) is a private arboretum located in Podestat, on the northern outskirts of Bergerac, Dordogne, Aquitaine, France. It is open by appointment; admission is free.

The arboretum was established circa 2000, and now contains a nationally recognized collection of miscanthus, as well as oaks, hornbeams, and various plants from Asia.

See also 
 List of botanical gardens in France

References 
 Parcs et Jardins entry (French)
 Gralon.net entry (French)

Podestat, Arboretum de
Podestat, Arboretum de